This list of museums in Cornwall, United Kingdom contains museums which are defined for this context as institutions (including nonprofit organizations, government entities, and private businesses) that collect and care for objects of cultural, artistic, scientific, or historical interest and make their collections or related exhibits available for public viewing. Also included are non-profit art galleries and university art galleries. Museums that exist only in cyberspace (i.e. virtual museums) are not included.

Museums

Defunct museums

 Barnes Museum of Cinematography, St Ives
 British Cycling Museum, Camelford Station, Camelford
 Cornwall Geological Museum, Penzance
 Trevarno. Closed in 2012. Included National Museum of Gardening, gardens, woodland walks, a sub-tropical conservatory
 Trinity House National Lighthouse Museum, Penzance

See also

 List of farms in Cornwall
 List of places in Cornwall
 List of windmills in Cornwall
 Visitor attractions in Cornwall

References

Cornwall Museums Group

Further reading

 
Museums
Cornwall